This is a list of wars involving the Kingdom of Saudi Arabia and its predecessor states.

Sheikhdom of Diriyah (1446–1744)

Emirate of Diriyah (1744–1818)

Emirate of Nejd (1824–1891)

Emirate of Riyadh (1902–1913)

Emirate of Nejd and Hasa (1913–1921)

Sultanate of Nejd (1921–1926)

Kingdom of Hejaz and Nejd (1926–1932)

Kingdom of Saudi Arabia (1932–present)

References

Further information

External links
 Hous of Saud, a 2005 documentary by PBS' Frontline.
  find out what really happened as told by a Cavalry Scout
 Website about the french Daguet Division
 Gulf War Discussion from the Dean Peter Krogh Foreign Affairs Digital Archives
 Historical Context from the Dean Peter Krogh Foreign Affairs Digital Archives
 Gulf War Guide – Iraq, U.S., UK Operation Desert storm War site with special features on the war
 Saddam Hussein & the invasion of Kuwait.
 CBC Digital Archives – The 1991 Gulf War
 Master Index of Desert Storm Oral History Interviews by the United States Army Center of Military History
 Bibliography of the Desert Shield and Desert Storm compiled by the United States Army Center of Military History
 Persian Gulf War
 20th Anniversary of Desert Storm in Photos
 Profile: Al Houthis

 
Saudi Arabia
History of Saudi Arabia
Wars